Frederick or Fred Clark may refer to:

Frederick Scotson Clark (1840–1883), English organist and composer
Frederick W. Clark (1857–1916), American engineer and businessman
F. Ambrose Clark (1880–1964), American equestrian heir
Patrick Clark (bishop) (Frederick Patrick Clark, 1908–1954), Canadian Anglican bishop
Fred Clark (1914–1968), American character actor
H. Fred Clark (1937–2012), American pediatrician and vaccinologist
Fred Clark (politician) (born 1959), American member of Wisconsin State Assembly
 Frederick Le Gros Clark (author), British children's author and an expert on malnutrition
 Frederick Le Gros Clark (surgeon), British surgeon

See also
Frederick Clarke (disambiguation)